The 2005–06 FA Women's Premier League Cup was the 15th edition of the FA Women's Premier League's league cup competition, which began in 1991. It was sponsored by Nationwide and was officially known as the FA Nationwide Women's Premier League Cup. The competition was contested by all 34 teams of the three divisions of the FA Women's Premier League (National Division, Northern Division and Southern Division). Charlton Athletic won their second title after a 2–1 win over Arsenal in the final.

Results
All results listed are published by The Football Association (FA). The division each team play in is indicated in brackets after their name: (NA)=National Division; (NO)=Northern Division; (S)=Southern Division.

Preliminary round

First round
The matches were played on 11 September 2005, the only exception being Arsenal v Wolverhampton Wanderers, which took place on 2 October 2005.

Second round
The matches were played on 9 October 2005, the only exception being Manchester City v Arsenal, which took place on 23 October 2005.

Quarter-finals
The matches were played on 6 November 2005, the only exception being Sunderland v Everton, which took place on 13 November 2005.

Semi-finals
All matches were played on 11 December 2005.

Final

References

See also
 2005–06 FA Women's Premier League
 2006 FA Women's Cup Final

FA Women's National League Cup